= Swaziland Kids Rugby Mission =

The Swaziland Kids Rugby Mission (SKRUM) was founded by Michael Collinson from Yorkshire in 2008 as a nonprofit organization that uses the game of rugby to engage children and teach them about sex awareness and education to curb the spread of HIV/AIDS. Michael Collinson, a former rugby player and coach, was paralyzed in a car accident in 2002. After battling years of depression, he realized just how much HIV/AIDS was affecting the local population and founded SKRUM to use rugby as a teaching tool against HIV/AIDS. Since its founding, SKRUM has visited 650 of the 817 schools in Eswatini and it reaches 12,000 youth each year through school and community outreach efforts. SKRUM’s moto is “Pass the Ball Not the Virus.”
